Mohammad Nurul Huq (August 1, 1915 – August 27, 1998) Bangladesh Awami League politician, retired officer of British Indian Army and Pakistan Army. He was elected a member of the East Pakistan Provincial Council in 1970 and elected to parliament from Meherpur-2 in 1986.

Birth and early life 
Nurul Haque was born August 1, 1915 in Meherpur.

Career 
Mohammad Nurul Huq was elected a member of the East Pakistan Provincial Council Awami League candidate in 1970 and elected to parliament from Meherpur-2 as a Bangladesh Awami League candidate in 1986.

Death 
Mohammad Nurul Haque  passed away on August 27, 1998.

See also 

 Jatiya Sangsad

References

External links 
 List of 3rd Parliament Members -Jatiya Sangsad (In Bangla)

1915 births
1998 deaths
People from Meherpur District
Awami League politicians
3rd Jatiya Sangsad members